Estêvão Cardoso de Avellar (November 4, 1917 – December 3, 2009) was a Brazilian bishop of the Roman Catholic Church.

Biography
Cardoso de Avella was born in Três Corações, Brazil, and was ordained a priest on October 6, 1946. He was appointed Coadjutor Prelate of the Diocese of Marabá along with being appointed Titular bishop of Eucarpia on August 6, 1971, and then ordained on September 26, 1971. On March 27, 1976 he was appointed prelate of Diocese of Santíssima Conceição do Araguaia. His final appointment came on March 20, 1978, to the Diocese of Uberlândia, where he retired from on December 23, 1992.

References

External links
Catholic Hierarchy
Marabá Diocese
Uberlândia Diocese

1917 births
2009 deaths
People from Três Corações
20th-century Roman Catholic bishops in Brazil
Roman Catholic bishops of Marabá
Roman Catholic bishops of Santíssima Conceição do Araguaia